Al-Wehda FC (Arabic: نادي الوحدة, romanized: nādī al-waḥda, lit. 'Union Club') is a multi-sports club from Mecca, Saudi Arabia, founded in 1916, making it the third oldest club in Saudi Arabia. The football section plays in the Saudi Professional League. They also have a handball section.

Honours
Saudi First Division (Level 2)
Winners (4): 1982–83, 1995–96, 2002–03, 2017–18
Runners-up (2): 2011–12, 2014–15
Third place (1): 2021–22

King Cup
Winners (2): 1957, 1966
Runners-up (5): 1958, 1959, 1960, 1961, 1970
Crown Prince Cup
Winners (1): 1959–60
Runners-up (5): 1958–59, 1963–64, 1969–70, 1972–73, 2010–11

(Source:)

International record

Current squad

{|
|-
| valign="top" |

Out on loan

Managerial history

 Hassan Sultan (1955–1957)
 Hassan Sultan (1965–1968)
 Raafat Attia (1974–1975)
 Redha Al Sayeh (1976–1977)
 Taha Ismail (1981–1983)
 Abdelmajid Chetali (1983–1985)
 Khaled Al-Jizani (1985)
 Mahmoud Abou-Regaila (1985–1986)
 Jairzinho (1988–1989)
 Mimi Abdelhamid (1989–1990)
 Pavle Dolezar (1995)
 Jean Fernandez (1997)
 Gaúcho (1998–1999)
 Eugen Moldovan (1999–2000)
 Khaled Al-Jizani (caretaker) (November 10, 1999 – November 27, 1999)
 David Roberts (November 27, 1999 – May 30, 2000)
 Dumitru Marcu (July 13, 2000 – March 2, 2001)
 Adel Latrach (March 2, 2001 – May 30, 2001)
 Vantuir (July 5, 2001 – January 14, 2002)
 Luis Carlos (January 14, 2002 – May 1, 2002)
 Zoran Đorđević (August 1, 2002 – October 23, 2002)
 Khalid Al-Koroni (October 23, 2002 – June 1, 2004)
 Lotfi Benzarti (July 1, 2004 – June 30, 2006)
 Theo Bücker (July 6, 2006 – May 31, 2007)
 Jan Versleijen (June 2, 2007 – February 19, 2008)
 Khalid Al-Koroni (February 19, 2008 – May 1, 2008)
 Theo Bücker (July 1, 2008 – June 30, 2009)
 Eurico Gomes (August 13, 2009 – June 30, 2010)
 Jean-Christian Lang (July 1, 2010 – December 23, 2010)
 Mokhtar Mokhtar (December 25, 2010 – May 8, 2011)
 Lotfi Benzarti (May 8, 2011 – May 25, 2011)
 Bashir Abdel Samad (May 26, 2011 – June 30, 2011)
 Dragan Cvetković (August 21, 2011 – November 24, 2011)
 Adel Latrach (November 26, 2011 – February 16, 2012)
 Bashir Abdel Samad (February 17, 2012 – August 30, 2012)
 Wajdi Essid (September 15, 2012 – January 26, 2013)
 Khalil Obaid (January 26, 2013 – April 27, 2013)
 Florin Cioroianu (July 21, 2013 – October 1, 2013)
 Mohamed Salah (October 1, 2013 – March 1, 2014)
 Abderrazek Chebbi (March 1, 2014 – April 5, 2014)
 Djamel Menad (June 7, 2014 – September 20, 2014)
 Khalid Al-Koroni (September 22, 2014 – October 28, 2014)
 Juan Rodríguez (November 17, 2014 – October 30, 2015)
 Kheïreddine Madoui (November 9, 2015 – December 9, 2016)
 Adel Abdel Rahman (December 11, 2016 – May 5, 2017)
 Jameel Qassem (July 1, 2017 – May 5, 2018)
 Fábio Carille (May 22, 2018 – December 13, 2018)
 Mido (December 17, 2018 – March 19, 2019)
 Juan Brown (March 20, 2019 – May 17, 2019)
 Mario Cvitanović (July 2, 2019 – September 16, 2019)
 José Daniel Carreño (September 16, 2019 – August 19, 2020)
 Essa Al-Mehyani (caretaker) (August 19, 2020 – September 9, 2020)
 Ivo Vieira (September 10, 2020 – February 2, 2021)
 Mahmoud Al-Hadid (February 2, 2021 – March 21, 2021)
 Giorgos Donis (March 23, 2021 – May 31, 2021)
 Habib Ben Romdhane (July 26, 2021 – June 1, 2022)
 Bruno Akrapović (June 16, 2022 – October 20, 2022)
 José Luis Sierra (October 20, 2022 – Present)

See also

References

External links
 Official club website
 Al-Wehda Logo and mascot designer
 Profile's team – kooora.com

 
Sport in Mecca
Sports clubs established in 1916
Saudi Arabian handball clubs
Football clubs in Mecca
Football clubs in Saudi Arabia
1916 establishments in the Ottoman Empire